Jamaica sent a delegation to compete at the 1972 Summer Paralympics in Heidelberg, West Germany. They sent twenty competitors, thirteen male and seven female.

Team 
They sent twenty competitors, thirteen male and seven female. Leone Williams was the country's best performer at these Games, winning five total medals, four on the track and one in the pool.

Medals 
Going into the 2016 Games, Jamaica's performance in Heidelberg continued to be their best ever. They won eight gold, three silver medals and a bronze medal.

Athletics 

Leone Williams won four medals in athletics at the 1972 Games, three golds and one silver.

Swimming 

Leone Williams won a silver in the women's 100m backstroke 6 event.

References 

Nations at the 1972 Summer Paralympics
1972
1972 in Jamaican sport